Yeshivat Maharat is a Jewish educational institution in The Bronx, New York, which was the first Open Orthodox yeshiva in North America to ordain women. The word Maharat is a Hebrew acronym for phrase manhiga hilkhatit rukhanit Toranit, denoting a female "leader of Jewish law spirituality and Torah". Semikha and the title of Maharat are awarded to graduates after a 3- or 4-year-long program composed of intensive studies of Jewish law, Talmud, Torah, Jewish thought, leadership training, and pastoral counseling. The ordination functions as a credentialed pathway for women in the Jewish community to serve as clergy members.

History
In 2009, Rabbi Avi Weiss and Rabbi Daniel Sperber ordained Rabba Sara Hurwitz. She was the first woman to receive Open Orthodox semikha. That same year, Hurwitz and Weiss founded Yeshivat Maharat as an Open Orthodox yeshiva (religious school) for women in New York, with Hurwitz as President.  Four years later, the first three gradates received ordination and went on to take Orthodox leadership positions in Montreal and Washington, D.C. By 2021, 48 women had graduated from Yeshivat Maharat, and gone on to serve in clergy roles in Open Orthodox synagogues, schools, hospitals, universities, and Jewish communal institutions.

In 2015, Lila Kagedan became the organization's first graduate to adopt the title Rabbi (רבי). Other graduates of Maharat have adopted titles such as Maharat, Rabba (רבה, a neologism), and Rabbanit (רבנית, traditionally denoting a rabbi's wife).

Response from the American Orthodox rabbinate 
In 2015, the Rabbinical Council of America passed a resolution stating that "RCA members with positions in Orthodox institutions may not ordain women into the Orthodox rabbinate, regardless of the title used; or hire or ratify the hiring of a woman into a rabbinic position at an Orthodox institution; or allow a title implying rabbinic ordination to be used by a teacher of Limudei Kodesh in an Orthodox institution." That same year, Agudath Israel of America denounced moves to ordain women, and went even further, declaring Yeshivat Maharat, Open Orthodoxy, Yeshivat Chovevei Torah, and other affiliated entities to be similar to other dissident movements throughout Jewish history in having rejected basic tenets of Judaism.

Avi Weiss has continuously tried to advocate for the right for female clergy to use the rabbi title. In protest of those denying this right to women, Weiss resigned from the Rabbinical Council of America.. Rabbi Asher Lopatin also resigned in protest of the RCA resolution.  Rabbi Seth Farber, an RCA member, called the RCA’s resolution a “PR stunt by the right-wing membership of the RCA in order to further deepen the dividing lines among orthodoxy,” and said that he believed the RCA leadership did not support the resolution.

Academics
The rabbinical students are divided into two tracks following a year of mekhina (preparation) through the Beit Midrash Program:

 Core Semikha Program
 Advanced Kollel: Executive Ordination Track

Partnership programs outside of semikha include the Joint Educators Program with Pardes for preparing day school or experimental educators, Mind the Gap with Yeshivat Chovevei Torah to prepare for communal roles and the Meorot fellowship with Yeshivat Chovevei Torah and Hillel International.

History of Orthodox Women Rabbis
The word "Maharat" comes from the four core values of the institution, decided upon at the semikhah (originally called "the conferral") of Rabba Sara Hurwitz. Hurwitz, whose title changed several months into her service at the Hebrew Institute of Riverdale, landed on her first title after discussions with Blu Greenberg who had previously published a now-famous article titled “Will There Be Orthodox Women Rabbis?” (1984). Later, in 2010, Hurwitz and Weiss changed her title to "Rabba" when it became clear that many people did not understand the title.

In response to the controversy, many articles were written in support of women taking Judaic positions of leadership. The authors include Rabbi Dr. Daniel Sperber, Rabbi Dr. Yoel Bin-Nun, and Rabbi Nahum Rabinovitch among others.

Publications
Students have been published in the Keren Journal,  The Times of Israel, BBC Sounds, Tablet Magazine, The Wall Street Journal and many more newspapers and journals, religious and secular.

See also
 Beit Midrash Har'el
 
 
 Midrasha / Seminary - Orthodox institution for women's Torah study
  Midrashot offering certifications in Rabbinic-level Halacha:
 Matan Women's Institute for Torah Studies
 Midreshet Lindenbaum
 Midreshet Ein HaNetziv
 WebYeshiva - advanced course-based Torah study for men and women, including the 3 year "Halacha Mastery Program"
 Women in Judaism and esp. #Views on the education of women
 Women rabbis
 
 Yeshivat Chovevei Torah - the Open Orthodox men's Yeshiva

References

External links
 Yeshivat Maharat Semikha Program

Women rabbis
Female religious leaders
Orthodox Jewish feminism
Open Orthodox Judaism
Orthodox yeshivas in New York City
Jewish women's organizations
Jews and Judaism in the Bronx